Captain Frederick Stovin-Bradford  (19 June 1919 – 23 September 1974) was a Royal Navy officer and aviator in the Fleet Air Arm. His obituary in The Times described him as one of the most colourful personalities in the Fleet Air Arm.

Early life and education
Stovin-Bradford was born in Hendon, Middlesex, and was educated at Bedford Modern School.

World War II

He was promoted to sub-lieutenant on 5 November 1940, with seniority from 19 June. After a period of time posted to the Admiralty at the end of 1941, he was promoted to lieutenant on 1 February 1942. After completing an Air Signaller's course, he was posted to 700 Naval Air Squadron in July 1942 to serve aboard the battleship , flying in Supermarine Walrus reconnaissance aircraft, and taking part in Russian convoys in May, in the landings in North Africa in November, and during the invasion of Sicily in July 1943. He was posted to the escort carrier  in September 1943 to serve as Operations Officer, taking part in hunter-killer operations in the Atlantic and on Arctic convoys, then served as a Liaison Officer on the staff of the Commander-in-Chief, Western Approaches Admiral Sir Max Horton from September 1944. Stovin-Bradford commanded 825 Naval Air Squadron from its reformation at RNAS Rattray in July 1945, and from 28 December 1945 commanded 735 Naval Air Squadron based at RNAS Burscough.

Post-war career
In 1946 Stovin-Bradford qualified as a pilot, and served in 812 Naval Air Squadron flying the Fairey Firefly Mk. VI, as part of 14th Carrier Air Group (14 CAG), also completing courses in fighter combat, ground attack and reconnaissance at the School of Naval Air Warfare.

He was promoted to commander on 31 December 1950, and for his "distinguished service in operations in Korean waters" he was awarded a bar to his Distinguished Service Cross on 29 June 1951.

From 1951 he served as Commander (Air) at the Naval Fighter School at RNAS Culdrose, and then from 1954 was a Staff Officer (Air) to the Flag Officer Aircraft Carriers, ( and ) receiving promotion to captain on 31 December 1955. According to his obituary, he was one of the youngest officers to be promoted to the rank of captain since the time of Nelson.

From June 1962 he was the Chief of Staff to Vice-Admiral John Graham Hamilton, Flag Officer Air (Home), based at RNAS Lee-on-Solent. Stovin-Bradford retired from the Navy on 30 July 1965, being made a Commander of the Order of the British Empire in the 1966 New Year Honours.

Later life
He then returned to Australia to live in Sydney, and to enjoy his wider interests. He was a fine musician, who composed Flying Stations, a special march for the Fleet Air Arm, which received its first public performance at the Royal Tournament at Earls Court in 1963. He was also an avid follower of Rugby Union, having served as President of Barbarian F.C., became a First Grade referee, and was serving as Vice-President of Eastwood Rugby Club at the time of his death.

Stovin-Bradford died in Sydney in 1974 and was survived by his wife and four children.

References

External links
 Portrait of Frederick Stovin-Bradford at the Imperial War Museum

1919 births
1974 deaths
People from Hendon
People educated at Bedford Modern School
Fleet Air Arm aviators
Royal Navy officers of World War II
Commanders of the Order of the British Empire
Recipients of the Distinguished Service Cross (United Kingdom)
Fleet Air Arm personnel of World War II